Coleophora praecipua is a moth of the family Coleophoridae. It is found in Algeria, Libya and Saudi Arabia.

References

praecipua
Moths described in 1907
Moths of Africa
Moths of Asia